The 1893 Burnley by-election was held on 6 February 1893 after the resignation of the incumbent Liberal MP Jabez Spencer Balfour due to the collapse of the Liberator Building Society, for which he was eventually convicted.  It was retained by the Liberal candidate Philip Stanhope.

References

Politics of Burnley
February 1893 events
1893 elections in the United Kingdom
1893 in England